Bechtold is a surname of German origin. Notable people with the surname include:

Adolf Bechtold (1926–2012), German footballer
John Bechtold (1924-1978), American politician
Karl K. Bechtold (1910–1970), New York state senator
Walter Bechtold (born 1947), German footballer

German-language surnames